Hanna Shevchuk (née Suslyk) (born 18 July 1996) is a Ukrainian racewalking athlete. She competed in women's 20 kilometres walk at the 2020 Summer Olympics

She competed in the women's 20 kilometres walk at the 2022 World Athletics Championships held in Eugene, Oregon, United States.

References

External links 
 

 

1996 births
Living people
Ukrainian female racewalkers
Athletes (track and field) at the 2020 Summer Olympics
Olympic athletes of Ukraine
20th-century Ukrainian women
21st-century Ukrainian women